The Importance of Being Earnest is a 1952 British comedy-drama film adaptation of the 1895 play by Oscar Wilde. It was directed by Anthony Asquith, who also adapted the screenplay, and was produced by Anthony Asquith, Teddy Baird, and Earl St. John.

Plot
The story takes place on February 14, 1895. It is about two gentlemen pretending to be people other than themselves. Interwoven in their storylines are two romance-stricken ladies, each possessing an unusual allegiance to the manliness of the name Ernest. London man-about-town Jack Worthing, who hides behind the name Ernest, is an aristocrat from the country with uncertain lineage. His friend, Algernon Moncrieff, is of moderate means and has also created an imaginary character, Bunbury. Algernon's cousin, Gwendolen Fairfax, has caught the eye of Jack. Jack's ward in the country, Cecily Cardew, has caught the eye of Algernon. Lady Bracknell rules the roost with her heavy-handed social mores.

The story begins in London. Jack and Algy are discussing life and love. Both reveal to each other their imaginary characters, Ernest and Bunbury. Jack reveals that he is in love with Algy's cousin, Gwendolen, and Algy reveals that he is in love with Jack's ward, Cecily. Both gentlemen begin to scheme the pursuit of their love. At tea that afternoon, Jack and Gwendolen secretly reveal their love for one another. Gwendolen makes it known that her “ideal has always been to love someone by the name of Ernest.” Jack fears she will find out his true identity. Lady Bracknell inquires as to Jack's pedigree. Jack confesses that he does not know who his parents are because, as a baby, he was found in a handbag in a cloakroom at Victoria Station. Lady Bracknell will not allow her daughter “—a girl brought up with the utmost care—to marry into a cloak-room, and form an alliance with a parcel.”

At the manor house in the country, Cecily is daydreaming as her governess, Miss Prism, tries to teach her German. Uninvited, Algy arrives from London and assumes the role of Ernest. While Algy and Cecily are getting acquainted with the parlor, Jack arrives in black mourning clothes and informs Miss Prism that his brother, Ernest, is dead. When Algy and Cecily come out to see him, the sad news loses its believability as everyone now thinks Algy is Ernest. In pursuit of Jack, Gwendolen arrives from London and meets Cecily. They both discover that they are engaged to Ernest, not realising one is Jack and one is Algy. When the men arrive in the garden, the confusion is cleared up. The ladies are put off that neither one is engaged to someone named Ernest.

Lady Bracknell arrives, by train. As everyone gathers in the drawing room, Lady Bracknell recognises Miss Prism as her late sister's baby's governess from twenty-eight years before. Miss Prism confesses that she inadvertently left the baby in her handbag at Victoria Station. Jack realised they are talking about him. He retrieves the handbag from his private room and shows Miss Prism. She acknowledges that the bag is hers. Lady Bracknell then tells Jack that he is her late sister's son and the older brother to Algy. Unable to ascertain who his father was, Jack looks in an Army journal, as his father was a general, and realises that his father's name was Ernest.  Thus it becomes apparent that his real name is also Ernest – as Lady Bracknell says, being the eldest son, he must have been named after his father.

The film ends with Jack saying, “I’ve now realised for the first time in my life the vital importance of being earnest.”

Cast

Michael Redgrave as John (Jack) Worthing
Michael Denison as Algernon Moncrieff
Edith Evans as Lady Bracknell
Joan Greenwood as Gwendolen Fairfax
Margaret Rutherford as Miss Prism
Miles Malleson as Canon Chasuble
Dorothy Tutin as Cecily Cardew
Aubrey Mather as Merriman
Walter Hudd as Lane
Richard Wattis as Seton

Adaptation
The film is largely faithful to Wilde's text, although it divides some of the acts into shorter scenes in different locations. Edith Evans's outraged delivery of the line "A handbag?" has become legendary. As actor Ian McKellen wrote, it is a performance "so acclaimed and strongly remembered that it inhibits audiences and actors years later,"
providing a challenge for anyone else taking on the role of Lady Bracknell.

The film is noted for its acting, although the parts played by Redgrave and Denison called for actors ten years younger. Margaret Rutherford, who plays Miss Prism in this adaptation, played Lady Bracknell in the 1946 BBC production.

Reception
A. H. Weiler called the casting of Dame Edith Evans in the role of Lady Bracknell "true genius".

Awards and nominations
The film received a BAFTA nomination for Dorothy Tutin as Most Promising Newcomer and a Golden Lion nomination for Anthony Asquith at the Venice Film Festival.

See also
The Importance of Being Earnest (original play by Oscar Wilde)
The Importance of Being Earnest (2002 film version)

References

Bibliography
The Great British Films, pp 156–158, Jerry Vermilye, 1978, Citadel Press, 
Street, Sarah. British National Cinema.  UK:Routledge 1997.  Print.

External links
 
 
 
 
 

1952 films
1952 romantic comedy films
British romantic comedy films
Films shot at Pinewood Studios
Films set in England
Films set in 1895
Films based on The Importance of Being Earnest
Films directed by Anthony Asquith
Films scored by Benjamin Frankel
1950s English-language films
1950s British films